Ondřej Vošta (born June 4, 1968) is a Czech former professional ice hockey forward.

Vošta played 292 games for Motor České Budějovice in the Czechoslovak First Ice Hockey League and Czech Extraliga. He also played in France's Super 16 for Sangliers Arvernes de Clermont during the 2002–03 season.

Vošta played in the 1988 World Junior Ice Hockey Championships for Czechoslovakia.

References

External links

1968 births
Living people
Czech ice hockey forwards
HC Kometa Brno players
Motor České Budějovice players
Orli Znojmo players
People from Tábor
ERC Selb players
HC Tábor players
Sportspeople from the South Bohemian Region
Czechoslovak ice hockey forwards
Czech expatriate ice hockey players in Germany
Czech expatriate sportspeople in France
Expatriate ice hockey players in France